Los santos  or The Holy Innocents is a Spanish drama film directed by Mario Camus, based on famous Miguel Delibes' novel of the same title. The movie stars Alfredo Landa and Francisco Rabal, who both won the Best Actor Award at the 1984 Cannes Film Festival. The film was the highest-grossing Spanish film in Spain at the time before being surpassed by La vaquilla.

In the 1984 edition of the Cannes Film Festival it was nominated for the Palme d'Or and won the Prize of the Ecumenical Jury Special Mention. Francisco Rabal and Alfredo Landa shared the Best Actor award at the same festival. It was voted the third best Spanish film by professionals and critics in 1996 Spanish cinema centenary.

Plot
Paco and Régula live on a rural estate owned by an absent marchioness with their three children. Nieves works as a maid in the big house, Quirce is doing his military service, and Charito is severely handicapped. The parents accept the repeated humiliations of their position as dependents at the whim of the owners and the estate manager, but Nieves and Quirce aim for a better life. The family is joined by Régula's mentally handicapped brother Azarías, sacked from another estate, who loves birds. 
The owner's son Ivan often comes back to the estate for two reasons: he is conducting an affair with the manager's bored wife Pura and he is fanatical about shooting birds. Paco, whom he forces up a tree to decoy pigeons, falls and breaks a leg. Then he tries using the simple Azarías and, in a fit of pique, shoots the man's pet jackdaw. Next time Azarías is sent up a tree to work decoys, he drops a noose round Ivan's neck and hangs him. Mentally a child, he is shut up in a secure asylum.

Cast
 Alfredo Landa as Paco el Bajo
 Terele Pávez as Régula, his wife
 Belén Ballesteros as Nieves, their elder daughter
 Juan Sánchez as Quirce, their son
 Susana Sánchez as La Niña Chica, their younger handicapped daughter
 Francisco Rabal as Azarías, Régula's handicapped brother
 Agustín González as Don Pedro, the estate manager
 Ágata Lys as Doña Pura, his wife
 Mary Carrillo as Señora Marquesa, the estate owner
 Juan Diego as Señorito Iván, her son
 Maribel Martín as Señorita Miriam, her daughter
 Manuel Zarzo as Don Manuel, the doctor

Production 
The distinctive landscapes are of the empty region of Extremadura, around the towns of Alburquerque and Zafra. Its distinctive soundtrack is played wholly on a three-stringed rabel, a folk instrument dating back to medieval times.

References

External links 

1984 films
Spanish drama films
1980s Spanish-language films
1984 drama films
Films set in Spain
Films based on Spanish novels
Films directed by Mario Camus
Films scored by Antón García Abril
1980s Spanish films